A refusenik is someone who was denied permission to emigrate by the Soviet Union. It can also mean someone who refuses to comply with a rule etc. 

Refusenik or refusnik may also refer to:
An Israeli conscientious objector, see Refusal to serve in the Israeli military 
Refusenik (film), 2007 documentary by Laura Bialis
Refusenik (Muslim), a term used by Irshad Manji in her 2005 book The Trouble with Islam Today
The stage name of the Lithuanian musician Arturas Bumšteinas